Events in the year 2023 in Barbados.

Incumbents 

 President: Sandra Mason
 Prime Minister: Mia Mottley

Events 
Ongoing – COVID-19 pandemic in Barbados

Scheduled 

 20 October – 5 November: Barbados at the 2023 Pan American Games

References 

 
2020s in Barbados
Years of the 21st century in Barbados
Barbados
Barbados